The Trygon Factor is a 1966 British-West German crime film directed by Cyril Frankel and starring Stewart Granger, Susan Hampshire and Robert Morley. It is one of the films based on works by Edgar Wallace of the 1960s and its German title is Das Geheimnis der weißen Nonne/ Mystery of the White Nun.

The film is based on the 1917 Edgar Wallace novel Kate Plus Ten.

Plot
A Scotland Yard inspector is called to investigate a series of unsolved robberies. Inspector Cooper-Smith (Stewart Granger) arrives at the country manor of a respectable English family. He discovers Livia Emberday (Cathleen Nesbitt), the mistress of the house, has turned to crime in order to bolster the family's flagging fortunes. With assistance from an order of bogus nuns, stolen goods end up in the warehouse of Hamlyn (Robert Morley), purportedly a respectable businessman.

Cast
 Stewart Granger as Superintendent Cooper-Smith
 Susan Hampshire as Trudy Emberday
 Robert Morley as Hubert Hamlyn
 Cathleen Nesbitt as Livia Emberday
 Brigitte Horney as Sister General
 Sophie Hardy as Sophie
 Diane Clare as Clare O'Connor (Sister Clare)
 James Robertson Justice as Sir John (voice: English version)
 Siegfried Schürenberg as Sir John – German Version
 Eddi Arent as Emil Clossen
 James Culliford as Luke Emberday
 Allan Cuthbertson as Detective Thompson
 Colin Gordon as Dice
 Caroline Blakiston as White Nun
 Richardina Jackson as Black Nun

Release
The film premiered in West Germany on 16 December 1966.

Critical reception
The Radio Times called it a "farcical British crime drama"; Variety noted, "a complicated Scotland Yard whodunit which the spectator will find taxing to follow...Script is pocketed with story loopholes and attempts to confuse, plus certain motivations and bits of business impossible to fathom. Granger still makes a good impression"; while Allmovie wrote, "there are plenty of twists in the storyline of this often complex mystery feature."

Cast member Susan Hampshire called the film "another B picture. Very often I did films because of tax demands" and said Stewart Granger had a big ego, but felt "we had a very interesting director in that film, Cyril Frankley, and I think it was one of the best acting performances I've ever given."

Soundtrack
The soundtrack composed by Peter Thomas was released in 1968 on a library LP (production music) "Jazz Graphics / The Spy Set" - KPM 1042 without any reference to the film. The LP is currently available as  Online release - again without any reference to the film. Parts of the soundtrack can be found on the CD "Kriminalfilmmusik - Peter Thomas", BSC Musik GmbH (2000).

References

External links
 

1966 films
1960s crime thriller films
1960s heist films
British crime thriller films
British heist films
German crime thriller films
West German films
English-language German films
Films based on British novels
Films based on works by Edgar Wallace
Films directed by Cyril Frankel
Films set in country houses
Works set in monasteries
Constantin Film films
1960s British films
1960s German films